The 2014 Aberto de São Paulo was a professional tennis tournament played on hard courts. It was the 14th edition of the tournament which was part of the 2014 ATP Challenger Tour. It took place in São Paulo, Brazil between 30 December 2013 and 5 January 2014.

Singles main-draw entrants

Seeds

 1 Rankings are as of December 23, 2013.

Other entrants
The following players received wildcards into the singles main draw:
  Rafael Camilo
  Osni Junior
  José Pereira
  Bruno Sant'anna

The following players used protected ranking to gain entry into the event:
  Daniel Kosakowski
  Eduardo Schwank

The following players received entry from the qualifying draw:
  Moritz Buerchner
  Henrique Cunha
  Marcelo Demoliner
  Fabiano de Paula

Champions

Singles

 João Souza def.  Alejandro González, 6–4, 6–4

Doubles

 Gero Kretschmer /  Alexander Satschko def.  N Barrientos /  V Estrella Burgos, 4–6, 7–5, [10–6]

External links
Official Website

Aberto de São Paulo
Aberto de São Paulo
Aberto de São Paulo
Aberto de São Paulo
Aberto de São Paulo